Ramón Valle (born 17 August 1976) is a Honduran swimmer. He competed in the men's 1500 metre freestyle event at the 1996 Summer Olympics and he finished in 29th place in the heats.

References

External links
 

1976 births
Living people
Honduran male swimmers
Olympic swimmers of Honduras
Swimmers at the 1996 Summer Olympics
Place of birth missing (living people)
20th-century Honduran people